José Raimundo Guzmão Ribeiro (born 29 July 1963) is a Brazilian rower. He competed in the men's coxed four event at the 1992 Summer Olympics.

References

1963 births
Living people
Brazilian male rowers
Olympic rowers of Brazil
Rowers at the 1992 Summer Olympics
Place of birth missing (living people)
Pan American Games medalists in rowing
Pan American Games silver medalists for Brazil
Rowers at the 1983 Pan American Games